Theodore F. Craver, Jr. is an American business executive. He is the retired Chairman, President and Chief Executive Officer (2008-2016) of Edison International, a public utility holding company listed on the New York Stock Exchange with $13 billion in revenues and $57 billion in assets.

Career

Financial services industry (1973–1996) 
 Craver worked for Security Pacific National Bank from 1973 to 1980 in the International Studies Section of the Economics Department, and later in the Foreign Exchange Department. 
 He worked for Bankers Trust Company from 1980 to 1984 in various capital markets sales and trading roles in the Los Angeles, New York and Hong Kong offices. 
 Craver worked for First Interstate Bancorp from 1984 to 1996. He served as EVP and Chief Financial Officer of the wholesale banking subsidiary (1986-1991) and EVP and Corporate Treasurer at the parent company (1991-1996). As Corporate Treasurer, he was responsible for treasury and funding functions of the 13 subsidiary banks, asset and liability management, investment management of $10 billion bank portfolio and $300 million venture capital portfolio, Bank Broker Dealer, and bank M&A.(19

Energy and utilities (1996–2016) 
Craver joined Edison International (NYSE:EIX) in 1996 as Treasurer of Edison International and Southern California Edison. He became the Chief Executive Officer of Edison Enterprises in 1999, charged with the restructuring of Edison's competitive retail electric business. He served as Chief Financial Officer of Edison International from 2000 to 2004. From 2005 to 2007, he served as Chief Executive Officer of Edison Mission Group, Edison International's Independent Power Producer.

Craver was elected a director of Edison International in October 2007, President in April 2008, and chairman and Chief Executive Officer in August 2008. He retired as Chairman and CEO in September 2016. Accomplishments during his tenure as CEO included: moved EIX from industry median to top quartile in 5-year Total Shareholder Return; doubled annual capital investment in electric infrastructure resulting in doubling rate base and earnings per share of the regulated utility; and increased dividends 57%. He led a comprehensive strategic repositioning of Edison International's business portfolio, whereby the company exited the independent power generation business, repositioned the regulated utility, Southern California Edison, to deemphasize investment in electric generation and focus investments on the transmission and distribution of electricity and modernizing the grid. He initiated a comprehensive Operational Excellence program to improve the customer experience, improve quality and efficiency of operations, and reduce costs and customer rates.

In 2009, Craver successfully negotiated for a solar energy contract for Edison "to install solar panels on unused commercial rooftops across Southern California." The contract also allows the company to "solicit other solar-power companies to install similar panel arrays and sell the power back to Edison, up to an additional 250 megawatts." Craver suggested this would strengthen the electrical grid in Southern California and create jobs.

During his term as CEO of Edison International, Craver served on the board of directors of the Electric Power Research Institute (the industry's R&D arm), the Institute of Nuclear Power Operations (the industry's nuclear generation self-regulatory body), the Edison Electric Institute (the electric industry's trade organization), and the Electric Drive Transportation Association (an association dedicated to advancing electric drive transportation). Craver served as Chairman of the Electric Power Research Institute (2011–2012) and of the Edison Electric Institute (2014–2015).

Education
Theodore F. Craver, Jr. graduated from the University of Southern California, where he received a Bachelor of Arts degree in Economics and International Relations (1974) and a Master of Business Administration (1977).

Awards
 Electric Light & Power, Large Utility CEO of the Year (2014)
 Edison Electric Institute, Distinguished Leadership Award (2016)
 Boy Scouts of America: Americanism Award, Distinguished Eagle Scout Award (2016)

Personal life
Craver resides with his wife in Los Angeles, California. 
He is an Eagle Scout (1967).

References

American energy industry executives
Southern California Edison
Year of birth missing (living people)
Living people
American chairpersons of corporations
American chief executives
American corporate directors
Businesspeople from Los Angeles
Marshall School of Business alumni